The Croix de Cessange is a motorway interchange in Luxembourg City, in southern Luxembourg.  It is the junction between two of Luxembourg's six motorways: the A6, on the bypass around the southwest of Luxembourg City, and the A4, which connects the city to Esch-sur-Alzette.  It lies in the Cessange quarter, in the southwest of the city, hence its name.

External links
  Administration des Ponts et Chaussées webpage on the Croix de Cessange

Road interchanges in Luxembourg
Transport in Luxembourg City